Iniyathra is a 1979 Indian Malayalam film,  directed by Srini. The film stars Srividya, Ravi Menon, Kuthiravattam Pappu and Nanditha Bose in the lead roles. The film has musical score by Shyam.

Cast
Srividya
Ravi Menon
Janardanan
Kuthiravattam Pappu
Nanditha Bose
Prathapan
Urmila

Soundtrack
The music was composed by Shyam and the lyrics were written by Poovachal Khader.

References

External links
 

1979 films
1970s Malayalam-language films